Estela Milanés Salazar (born December 23, 1967) is a Cuban softball player.

Milanés appeared in the 2000 Summer Olympics, competing for Cuba. Her son is Yoenis Céspedes.

References

External links
Olympic record

1967 births
Living people
Softball players at the 2000 Summer Olympics
Olympic softball players of Cuba
Cuban softball players
Softball players